Janel may refer to:

 Janel, variant among Janelle (given names)
 Emil Janel (1897–1981), Swedish-born American artist
 Janel, fictional character in "Prodigal Daughter" television episode in Star Trek franchise

See also 
 Janelle (disambiguation)
 Janell, a given name

Disambiguation pages with given-name-holder lists